Mystic Places of Dawn is the first album by Septic Flesh, released in 1994.

History
The album was reissued in 2002 with the Temple of the Lost Race EP as bonus tracks and then again in 2013 by Seasons of Mist. Though someone named "Jim" is credited for drums, in fact all drums were programmed, with the exception of "Morpheus (the Dreamlord)", which features drumming by Nick Adams (who also performed session work for the Greek black metal act Necromantia).

The cover art on the vinyl edition was by Boris Vallejo.

Track listing
All lyrics written by Sotiris V.

Personnel 
 Septic Flesh – production
 Spiros A. – bass, vocals, artwork
 Sotiris V. – guitars, vocals, keyboards
 Christos A. – guitars, keyboards (track 9)
 Jim – drums

 Additional musicians 
 Nick Adams – drums (track 8)
 Magus Wampyr Daoloth – additional howls (track 3)

 Production 
 George "Magus Wampyr Daoloth" Zaharopoulos – production, engineering (tracks 1 – 7, 9)
 Antonis Delaportas – production, engineering (track 8)

References 

1994 debut albums
Septicflesh albums
Albums by Greek artists
Holy Records albums
Season of Mist albums
Albums with cover art by Boris Vallejo